The Fred A. Perley House is a historic house located in Jenningston, West Virginia. Fred A. Perley, one of the founders of Perley & Crockett Lumber Company, built the house circa 1907. Perley, who was trained as an engineer, designed the house and oversaw its construction. The house has a rustic design with hemlock bark siding, a style which was most likely chosen to resemble Adirondack buildings. The home site also includes a chicken coop, which is considered a contributing building, and the remains of a barn and generator house, both of which are non-contributing. Perley sold the house in 1913 when his company's headquarters moved to North Carolina; after passing through two other owners, it became a summer home for the Laurel River Club in 1925. Due to a 1985 flood, the house is the only surviving building from Perley & Crockett's operations in Jenningston.

The house was added to the National Register of Historic Places on September 14, 1988. The house's address is restricted in its National Register listing; this is generally done to protect sensitive locations from damage.

References

Houses on the National Register of Historic Places in West Virginia
Houses completed in 1907
National Register of Historic Places in Randolph County, West Virginia
Houses in Randolph County, West Virginia
Historic districts on the National Register of Historic Places in West Virginia